Luke Beauchamp (born 8 October 1992) is an Australian professional rugby union player. He currently plays for the Austin Gilgronis. He played as a flanker for the Chicago Hounds in Major League Rugby (MLR) previously playing for the Houston SaberCats. He also played for Brisbane City in National Rugby Championship.

References

1992 births
Living people
Australian expatriate rugby union players
Australian expatriate sportspeople in the United States
Brisbane City (rugby union) players
Expatriate rugby union players in the United States
Houston SaberCats players
Rugby union players from Brisbane
Rugby union flankers
Rugby union number eights
Australian rugby union players
Queensland Country (NRC team) players
Austin Gilgronis players
Chicago Hounds (rugby union) players